The 1973 Viceroy Classic – Singles was an event of the 1973 Viceroy Classic men's tennis tournament that was played Hong Kong from 29 October until 4 November 1973. The draw comprised 32 players. Rod Laver won the singles title, defeating Charlie Pasarell in the final, 6–3, 3–6, 6–2, 6–2.

Draw

Finals

Top half

Bottom half

References

External links
 ITF tournament edition details

Viceroy Classic
1973 in Hong Kong
Tennis in Hong Kong